Henry Thomas Hamilton Foley (25 April 1905 – 13 December 1959) was an English cricketer who played a single first-class match for Worcestershire against Oxford University in May 1925; he scored 6 and 0 not out. He later played for Monmouthshire in the Minor Counties Championship. His father was the cricketer and administrator Paul Foley.

Notes

References
Henry Foley from CricketArchive

English cricketers
Worcestershire cricketers
1905 births
1959 deaths
Monmouthshire cricketers
Foley family